Log Hill Mesa is a mesa in Ouray County, Colorado. Log Hill Mesa includes part of the southern end of the Uncompahgre Plateau and faces south towards the Sneffels Range.

Recreation
Log Hill Mesa is home to the mountain resort community of Loghill Village. In addition to the amenities of Loghill Village, the mesa is popular as a hiking, cross country skiing, and biking destination.

See also
 Cimmaron Range
 Sneffels Range

References

Mesas of Colorado
Landforms of Ouray County, Colorado